Sala Fata Pinati is a Samoan politician and former Cabinet Minister. He is a member of the Human Rights Protection Party.

Pinati was previously a member of the board of the Development Bank of Samoa. He was first elected to the Legislative Assembly of Samoa at the 2006 Samoan general election, and appointed Associate Minister of Agriculture. In 2007 he became Associate Minister of Education, and then from 2008 - 2010 he served as Associate Minister of Finance. Following the 2011 election he was prosecuted for bribery, but the charge was later dropped. In March 2011 he was appointed to Cabinet as Minister of Police and Prisons. During this term he separated management of prisons from the police, establishing an independent Samoa Prisons and Corrections Services.

He was re-elected at the 2016 election, and retained his position as Minister of Police and Prisons. Following the election, he was again prosecuted for bribery, but the charge was again withdrawn. A Cabinet reshuffle in June 2016 saw him lose his Prisons portfolio to Tialavea Tionisio Hunt, instead becoming Minister of Tourism and the Public Trust Office. A further reshuffle in November 2016 saw him lose his Police portfolio to Prime Minister Tuilaepa Aiono Sailele Malielegaoi and pick up responsibility for the Audit Office and Bureau of Statistics.

He ran in the newly-created Sagaga No. 3 electorate at the 2021 election and was elected.

References

Members of the Legislative Assembly of Samoa
Living people
Government ministers of Samoa
Human Rights Protection Party politicians
Year of birth missing (living people)